This article is a collection of statewide polls for the 2016 United States presidential election. The polls listed here provide early data on opinion polling between the Democratic candidate, the Republican candidate, the Libertarian candidate, and the Green candidate. Prior to the parties' conventions, presumptive candidates were included in the polls. State polling is not conducted in all states for the election due to various factors. More polls usually are conducted in states that are considered swing states as more attention is given to the results. For determining a statistical tie, the margin of error provided by the polling source is applied to the result for each candidate.

Most recent polling
Immediately before the election, Hillary Clinton had a vote lead among states recently polled. State polls with results outside the margin of error showed 213 potential electoral votes for Clinton and 162 potential electoral votes for Donald Trump. In 14 states and two congressional districts (150 electoral votes), results for Clinton and Trump were within the margin of error.  For the two states and one district without recent polling, one state (6 electoral votes) voted for Mitt Romney in the 2012 election, while one state and district (7 electoral votes) voted for Barack Obama. Third party candidates, such as Jill Stein and Gary Johnson, were also included in many statewide polls. They have not received support in statewide polling that surpasses the two main party nominees. Independent candidate Evan McMullin was tied with Donald Trump in the state of Utah, but he has only been included on a very limited number of statewide polls.

Alabama
9 electoral votes (Republican in 2008) 60%–39%(Republican in 2012) 61%–38%

Winner (Republican in 2016) 62%-34%

Alaska
3 electoral votes (Republican in 2008) 59%–38%(Republican in 2012) 55%–41%

Winner (Republican in 2016) 51%-37%

Two-way race

Four-way race

Arizona
11 electoral votes (Republican in 2008) 53%–45%(Republican in 2012) 53%–44%

Winner (Republican in 2016) 48%-45%

Two-way race

Three-way race

Four-way race

Arkansas
6 electoral votes (Republican in 2008) 59%–39%(Republican in 2012) 61%–37%

Winner (Republican in 2016) 61%-34%

Two-way race

Four-way race

California
55 electoral votes (Democratic in 2008) 61%–37%(Democratic in 2012) 60%–37%

Winner (Democratic in 2016) 62%-32%

Two-way race

Four-way race

Colorado
9 electoral votes (Democratic in 2008) 54%–45%(Democratic in 2012) 51%–46%

Winner (Democratic in 2016) 48%-43%

Two-way race

Three-way race

Four-way race

Five-way race

Connecticut
7 electoral votes (Democratic in 2008) 61%–38%(Democratic in 2012) 58%–41%

Winner (Democratic in 2016) 55%-41%

Four-way race

Delaware
3 electoral votes (Democratic in 2008) 62%–37%(Democratic in 2012) 59%–40%

Winner (Democratic in 2016) 53%-42%

Four-way race

District of Columbia
3 electoral votes (Democratic in 2008) 92%–7%(Democratic in 2012) 91%–7%

Winner (Democratic in 2016) 91%-4%

No polling was conducted post August 1, 2016

Florida

29 electoral votes (Democratic in 2008) 51%–48%(Democratic in 2012) 50%–49%

Winner (Republican in 2016) 49%-48%

Georgia
16 electoral votes (Republican in 2008) 52%–47%(Republican in 2012) 53%–45%

Winner (Republican in 2016) 51%-46%

Two-way race

Three-way race

Four-way race

Hawaii
4 electoral votes (Democratic in 2008) 72%–27%(Democratic in 2012) 71%–28%

Winner (Democratic in 2016) 62%-30%

No polling was conducted in 2016

Idaho
4 electoral votes (Republican in 2008) 61%–36%(Republican in 2012) 64%–32%

Winner (Republican in 2016) 59%-28%

Four-way race

Illinois
20 electoral votes (Democratic in 2008) 62%–37%(Democratic in 2012) 58%–41%

Winner (Democratic in 2016) 56%-39%

Two-way race

Four-way race

Indiana

11 electoral votes(Democratic in 2008) 50%–49%   (Republican in 2012) 54%–44%

Winner (Republican in 2016) 57%-38%

Three-way race

Four-way race

Iowa
6 electoral votes (Democratic in 2008) 54%–44%(Democratic in 2012) 52%–46%

Winner (Republican in 2016) 51%-42%

Two-way race

Four-way race

Five-way race

Kansas
6 electoral votes(Republican in 2008) 56%–42%   (Republican in 2012) 60%–38%

Winner (Republican in 2016) 57%-36%

Two-way race

Four-way race

Kentucky

8 electoral votes(Republican in 2008) 57%–41%   (Republican in 2012) 60%–38%

Winner (Republican in 2016) 63%-33%

Two-way race

Five-way race

Louisiana

8 electoral votes(Republican in 2008) 59%–40%   (Republican in 2012) 58%–41%

Winner (Republican in 2016) 58%-38%

Three-way race

Four-way race

Maine

4 electoral votes (Statewide vote worth 2 EVs; 1st and 2nd congressional districts worth 1 EV each)(Democratic in 2008) 58%–40%   (Democratic in 2012) 56%–41%

Winner (Democratic in 2016) 48%-45%

Four-way race

Maryland

10 electoral votes(Democratic in 2008) 62%–36%   (Democratic in 2012) 62%–36%

Winner (Democratic in 2016) 60%-34%

Four-way race

Massachusetts

11 electoral votes(Democratic in 2008) 62%–36%   (Democratic in 2012) 61%–38%

Winner (Democratic in 2016) 60%-33%

Two-way race

Four-way race

Michigan

16 electoral votes(Democratic in 2008) 57%–41%   (Democratic in 2012) 54%–45%

Winner (Republican in 2016) 48%-47%

Two-way race

Three-way race

Four-way race

Minnesota

10 electoral votes(Democratic in 2008) 54%–44%   (Democratic in 2012) 53%–45%

Winner (Democratic in 2016) 46%-45%

Two-way race

Four-way race

Five-way race

Mississippi
6 electoral votes(Republican in 2008) 56%–43%   (Republican in 2012) 55%–44%

Winner (Republican in 2016) 58%-40%

No polling conducted post September 1, 2016

Missouri

10 electoral votes(Republican in 2008) 49.4%–49.2%   (Republican in 2012) 53%–44%

Winner (Republican in 2016) 57%-38%

Two-way race

Three-way race

Four-way race

Montana

3 electoral votes(Republican in 2008) 49%–47%   (Republican in 2012) 55%–42%

Winner (Republican in 2016) 56%-36%

Three-way race

Four-way race

Nebraska

5 electoral votes (Statewide vote worth 2 EVs; 1st, 2nd, and 3rd congressional districts worth 1 EV each)(Republican in 2008) 57%–42%(Republican in 2012) 60%–38%

Winner (Republican in 2016) 59%-34%

Four-way race

Nevada

6 electoral votes(Democratic in 2008) 55%–43%   (Democratic in 2012) 52%–46%

Winner (Democratic in 2016) 48%-46%

Two-way race

Three-way

Four-way race

Five-way race

New Hampshire

4 electoral votes(Democratic in 2008) 54%–45%   (Democratic in 2012) 52%–46%

Winner (Democratic in 2016) 48%-47%

Two-way race

Four-way race

Five-way race

New Jersey
14 electoral votes(Democratic in 2008) 57%–42%   (Democratic in 2012) 58%–41%

Winner (Democratic in 2016) 55%-41%

Two-way race

Four-way race

New Mexico
5 electoral votes(Democratic in 2008) 57%–42%   (Democratic in 2012) 53%–43%

Winner (Democratic in 2016) 48%-40%

Four-way race

New York

29 electoral votes(Democratic in 2008) 63%–36%   (Democratic in 2012) 63%–35%

Winner (Democratic in 2016) 59%-37%

Four-way race

North Carolina

15 electoral votes(Democratic in 2008) 50%–49%   (Republican in 2012) 50%–48%

Winner (Republican in 2016) 50%-46%

Three-way race

Four-way race

North Dakota
3 electoral votes (Republican in 2008) 53%–45%(Republican in 2012) 58%–39%

Winner (Republican in 2016) 63%-27%

Four-way race

Ohio

18 electoral votes(Democratic in 2008) 51%–47%   (Democratic in 2012) 51%–48%

Winner (Republican in 2016) 52%-44%

Two-way race

Three-way race

Four-way race

Five-way race

Oklahoma
7 electoral votes(Republican in 2008) 66%–34%   (Republican in 2012) 67%–33%

Winner (Republican in 2016) 65%-29%

Three-way race

Oregon
7 electoral votes(Democratic in 2008) 57%–40%   (Democratic in 2012) 54%–42%

Winner (Democratic in 2016) 50%-39%

Four-way race

Pennsylvania
20 electoral votes(Democratic in 2008) 54%–44%   (Democratic in 2012) 52%–47%

Winner (Republican in 2016) 48%-47%

Three-way race

Four-way race

Rhode Island

4 electoral votes(Democratic in 2008) 63%–35%   (Democratic in 2012) 63%–35%

Winner (Democratic in 2016) 54%-39%

Four-way race

South Carolina

9 electoral votes(Republican in 2008) 54%–45%   (Republican in 2012) 55%–44%

Winner (Republican in 2016) 55%-41%

Three-way race

Four-way race

South Dakota

3 electoral votes(Republican in 2008) 53%–45%   (Republican in 2012) 58%–40%

Winner (Republican in 2016) 62%-32%

Three-way race

Four-way race

Tennessee

11 electoral votes(Republican in 2008) 57%–42%   (Republican in 2012) 59%–39%

Winner (Republican in 2016) 61%-35%

Four-way race

Texas

38 electoral votes(Republican in 2008) 55%–44%   (Republican in 2012) 57%–41%

Winner (Republican in 2016) 52%-43%

Two-way race

Three-way race

Four-way race

Utah

6 electoral votes(Republican in 2008) 62%–34%   (Republican in 2012) 73%–25%

Winner (Republican in 2016) 46%-28%

Four-way race

Five-way race

Six-way race

Vermont

3 electoral votes(Democratic in 2008) 67%–30%   (Democratic in 2012) 67%–31%

Winner (Democratic in 2016) 56%-30%

Four-way race

Virginia

13 electoral votes  (Democratic in 2008) 53%–46%   (Democratic in 2012) 51%–47%

Winner (Democratic in 2016) 50%-44%

Two-way race

Three-way race

Four-way race

Five-way race

Washington
12 electoral votes(Democratic in 2008) 57%–40%   (Democratic in 2012) 56%–41%

Winner (Democratic in 2016) 54%-38%

Two-way race

Four-way race

West Virginia

5 electoral votes(Republican in 2008) 56%–43%   (Republican in 2012) 62%–36%

Winner (Republican in 2016) 69%-26%

Two-way race

Three-way race

Wisconsin
10 electoral votes  (Democratic in 2008) 56%–42%   (Democratic in 2012) 53%–46%

Winner (Republican in 2016) 47%-46%

Three-way race

Four-way race

Wyoming

3 electoral votes  (Republican in 2008) 65%–33%   (Republican in 2012) 69%–28%

Winner (Republican in 2016) 67%-22%

Four-way race

See also
General election polling
Nationwide opinion polling for the 2016 United States presidential election
Nationwide opinion polling for the 2016 United States presidential election by demographic
International opinion polling for the 2016 United States presidential election

Democratic primary polling
Nationwide opinion polling for the 2016 Democratic Party presidential primaries
Statewide opinion polling for the 2016 Democratic Party presidential primaries

Republican primary polling
Nationwide opinion polling for the 2016 Republican Party presidential primaries
Statewide opinion polling for the 2016 Republican Party presidential primaries

Older polling
Pre-2016 statewide opinion polling for the 2016 United States presidential election

Notes

References 

Opinion polling for the 2016 United States presidential election